The following is a list of ecoregions in Vietnam defined by the World Wide Fund for Nature (WWF).

Terrestrial ecoregions
Vietnam is in the Indomalayan realm. Ecoregions are sorted by biome.

Tropical and subtropical moist broadleaf forests
Cardamom Mountains rain forests
Luang Prabang montane rain forests
Northern Annamites rain forests
Northern Indochina subtropical moist forests
Northern Vietnam lowland rain forests
Red River freshwater swamp forests
South China-Vietnam subtropical evergreen forests
Southern Annamites montane rain forests
Tonle Sap freshwater swamp forests
Tonle Sap-Mekong peat swamp forests

Tropical and subtropical dry broadleaf forests
Central Indochina dry forests
Southeastern Indochina dry evergreen forests
Southern Vietnam lowland dry forests

Mangroves
 Indochina mangroves

Freshwater ecoregions
The freshwater ecoregions of Vietnam include:
 Xi Yiang
 Sông Hồng
 Northern Annam
 Southern Annam
 Mekong River
 Kratie–Stung Treng
 Mekong Delta

Marine ecoregions
Vietnam's coastal waters are in the Central Indo-Pacific marine realm.
 Gulf of Thailand
 Gulf of Tonkin
 South China Sea Oceanic Islands (disputed)
 Southern Vietnam

References

 
Vietnam
Eco